Arthur Francis Kelly "Frank" Block (21 June 1899 – 4 March 1971) was an Australian politician.

Born in Echuca to labourer Albert Alfred Block and Annie Kelly, he attended state schools and served in the Australian Imperial Force's 46th Battalion during World War I; he was wounded at sent home to Preston around 1915. Around 1919 he married Louisa Rubena Adelaide Davis, with whom he had six children; he would remarry around 1942 to Vida Winifred Ross. Block, who worked as a building contractor, was a member of the Labor Party in the 1930s but joined the Liberal Party at its formation. He was elected to the Victorian Legislative Assembly in 1951 in a by-election for the seat of Ivanhoe, but was defeated at the next election in 1952. Block died in 1971 at Preston.

References

1899 births
1971 deaths
Liberal Party of Australia members of the Parliament of Victoria
Members of the Victorian Legislative Assembly
Australian Army soldiers
People from Echuca
20th-century Australian politicians